Local government. in Maharashtra State follows the general structure of Local Governance in India and is broadly classified into two categories: Urban Local Governance and Rural Local Governance.

Urban Local Governance
Maharashtra is the third most urbanised state in India with 42.23% of its population living in urban areas, compared with the national average of 31.16%. The urban population grew by 23.7% in the 2001–2011 period to 50.8 million and now has the highest number of people living in urban areas. Maharashtra has 255 Statutory Towns and 279 Census Towns.

Municipal Acts 
There are three municipal acts in effect in Maharashtra; 

Section 3 of Maharashtra Municipal Corporations Act, and Sections 3,4, and 341A of Maharashtra Municipal Councils, Nagar Panchayats and Industrial Townships Act, 1965 create the following categories of urban areas based on their population.

Further, depending on the population size, the Acts prescribes the minimum and maximum number of councillors/wards allowed within each type of local government.

Municipal Corporations
There are 28 Municipal Corporations in Maharashtra, as follows:

Municipal councils
There are 226 municipalities in Maharashtra. Some Municipal Councils are:

Ward Committees 
Section 66A of Maharashtra Municipal Councils, Nagar Panchayats and Industrial Townships Act, 1965 mandates the setting up of wards committees in municipal areas with a population more than 300,000. Thus, Nagar Panchayats, and Type B and C Municipal Councils are automatically relieved of setting up Wards Committees, as well as Type A Municipal Councils with population less than 300,000. More than one ward may constitute one Wards Committee and it is left to the discretion of the municipal body to decide upon the number of such wards.

Section 29A of the Maharashtra Municipal Corporations Act mandates the setting up of wards committees in areas with Municipal Corporations. It gives more details about the number of wards committees to be formed according to population size:

While bigger cities like Mumbai and Pune have formed Wards Committees which are active, smaller cities are yet to have active wards committees.

Rural Local Governance
Rural governance in India is based on the Panchayati Raj system. It is a three tier system, with the Zilla Parishad at the district level, Taluka panchayat at the Taluka or sub-district level and Grampanchayat (Village Council) at the lowest level. It is governed under the Maharashtra Zilla Parishads and Panchayat Samitis Acts 1961 of Maharashtra State. That act was amended with Act XXI to bring it in line with 73rd amendment to the Indian constitution in 1994.

Zilla parishad
Zilla Parishad (commonly known as ZP) is a local government body at the district level in India. It looks after the administration of the rural area of the district and its office is located at the district headquarters.

There are 34 Zilla Parishads in Maharashtra which are as follows.

 Thane Zilla Parishad
 Palghar Zilla Parishad
 Raigad Zilla Parishad Alibag
 Ratnagiri Zilla Parishad
 Sindhudurg Zilla Parishad
 Nashik Zilla Parishad
 Dhule Zilla Parishad
 Nandurbar Zilla Parishad
 Jalgaon Zilla Parishad
 Ahmednagar Zilla Parishad
 Pune Zilla Parishad 
 Satara Zilla Parishad
 Sangli Zilla Parishad
 Solapur Zilla Parishad
 Kolhapur Zilla Parishad
 Aurangabad Zilla Parishad
 Jalna Zilla Parishad
 Parbhani Zilla Parishad
 Hingoli Zilla Parishad
 Beed Zilla Parishad
 Nanded Zilla Parishad
 Osmanabad Zilla Parishad
 Latur Zilla Parishad
 Amravati Zilla Parishad
 Akola Zilla Parishad
 Washim Zilla Parishad
 Buldhana Zilla Parishad
 Yavatmal Zilla Parishad
 Nagpur Zilla Parishad
 Wardha Zilla Parishad
 Bhandara Zilla Parishad
 Gondiya Zilla Parishad
 Chandrapur Zilla Parishad
 Gadchiroli Zilla Parishad

Panchayat samiti
Panchayat samiti is a local government body at the Taluka (sub-district)( level in India. It works for the villages that together are called a Block. The Panchayat Samiti is the link between the Gram Panchayat and Zilla Parishad.

There are 351 panchayat samitis or block panchayats in Maharashtra.

Gram panchayat

Gram panchayats are local self-government bodies at the village level. They are a cornerstone of the panchayati raj system. A gram panchayat can be set up in villages with a population of more than five hundred. There is a common gram panchayat for two or more villages if the population of these villages is less than five hundred, whereupon it is called a group-gram panchayat. The panchayat members are elected by the voters in the village but seats are reserved for different categories. 33% of the seats are reserved for women. The scheduled castes (SC), scheduled tribes(ST), and other backward classes (OBC) get seats allocated in proportion to their population in the village. The office holder positions (sarpanch and the deputy sarpanch positions) are rotated  between different demographics such as women, SC, ST. , general category etc.

There are 28,813 gram panchayats in Maharashtra.

Elections
All elected officials in local bodies serve for five years. Elections are for the positions are conducted by the Maharashtra State Election Commission

See also

Local Governance in Kerala
Decentralisation and Local Governance in Kerala

References
Economic Survey of Maharashtra 2014-15

 
Government of Maharashtra
Maharashtra